Niners Chemnitz e.V., also named Chemnitz 99, is a German basketball club based in Chemnitz, Saxony. Currently, the team plays in the Basketball Bundesliga. Since its foundation, the team has played in Germany's lower divisions but moved up second division ProA in 2002. It promoted to Germany's prime league Basketball Bundesliga for the first time in 2020.

History
The club was formed in 1999 as "BV Chemnitz 99" by the fusion of the clubs BG Chemnitz and Lok Chemnitz. In 2001, BV Chemnitz 99 began a cooperation with the Chemnitz University of Technology, which is why "TU" was added to the team name. In the summer of  2002, the division of the men's team (BV TU Chemnitz 99) and the women's team (Chemcats Chemnitz) followed. For the men's team, the nickname Niners evolved through the foundation year 1999.

On 28 May 2015, Chemnitz hired Argentine Rodrigo Pastore as new head coach. In 2017, the nickname Niners was officially adopted as new club name.

In the 2019–20 season, Chemnitz was highly successful until the season was declared void due to the COVID-19 pandemic. Based on its first place in the standings, the Niners were promoted to the Basketball Bundesliga for the first time in club history.

The Niners will enter the qualifying rounds of the 2022–23 Basketball Champions League, making their debut in European competition.

Season by season

Source: Eurobasket.com

Arenas
The first arena of Chemnitz 99 was the Richard-Hartmann-Halle, which had a maximum capacity of 2,000 people. Starting from the 2019–20 season, the team moved to the Chemnitz Arena, with a capacity of 5,200 people.

Players

Current roster

Notable players

References

External links
Official web site
Profile on Pro A web site

 
1999 establishments in Germany
Basketball teams established in 1999
Basketball teams in Germany
Sport in Chemnitz
Sport in Saxony